This is a list of foreign players that have played in the Campeonato Brasileiro Série A. The following players:
have played at least one game for the respective club.

Players in bold have played at least one game for their national team.

Africa (CAF)

Algeria 
Khaled Kharroubi – Vitória (2003–2004)

Angola 
Geraldo – Coritiba (2011, 2013–2014)
Johnson Macaba – Gama (2001), Goiás (2006)

Cameroon 
Joel Tagueu – Coritiba (2014), Cruzeiro (2015, 2019), Santos (2016), Botafogo (2017), Avaí (2017)
William Andem – Cruzeiro (1994–1996), Bahia (1997)

Equatorial Guinea 
André Neles – Atlético Mineiro (1999–2000, 2004), Vitória (2002), Internacional (2003), Figueirense (2004), Fortaleza (2005–2006)
Daniel Martins – Desportiva Ferroviária (1993), Ponte Preta (1999, 2000, 2002), Corinthians (2000), Palmeiras (2001, 2003–2004)

Ivory Coast 
Salomon Kalou – Botafogo (2020)

Nigeria 
Dominic Vinicius – Athletico Paranaense (2014)

Sierra Leone 
Aluspah Brewah – Flamengo (2004), Fortaleza (2005)

South Africa 
Mark Williams – Corinthians (1996)

Togo 
Hamílton – Náutico (2008), Sport Recife (2009, 2012)

Tunisia 
Ady – Bahia (1994–1996), Santos (1998), Portuguesa (1999)

Asia (AFC)

China 
Alan – Fluminense (2008–2010, 2022–)
Aloísio – Figueirense (2011–2012), São Paulo (2013), América Mineiro (2022–)
Elkeson – Vitória (2009–2011), Botafogo (2011–2012)
Chen Zhizhao – Corinthians (2012–2013)

India 
Romeo Fernandes – Athletico Paranaense (2015)

Japan 
Kazu Miura – Santos (1986, 1990), Palmeiras (1986), Coritiba (1988–1989)
Keisuke Honda – Botafogo (2020)

Lebanon 
Jadir Morgenstern – Athletico Paranaense (1993–1994)

Qatar 
Emerson Sheik – São Paulo (1998–1999), Flamengo (2009, 2015–2016), Fluminense (2010–2011), Corinthians (2011–2014, 2018), Botafogo (2014), Ponte Preta (2017)

South Korea 
Chico – Atlético Goianiense (2020), Juventude (2021–)

Timor-Leste 
Patrick Fabiano – CSA (2019)

United Arab Emirates 
Abdulla Al Kamali – Athletico Paranaense (2008–2009)

Europe (UEFA)

Austria 
Felipe Dorta – Athletico Paranaense (2018)

Bosnia and Herzegovina 
Sanjin Pintul – Athletico Paranaense (1997)

Bulgaria 
Lúcio Wagner – Botafogo (1998)

Croatia 
Eduardo da Silva – Flamengo (2014–2015), Athletico Paranaense (2017–2018)
Sammir – Athletico Paranaense (2004)

Germany 
Alexander Baumjohann – Coritiba (2017), Vitória (2018)
Alexander Kamianecky – America-RJ (1971–1979), América-RN (1980), Nacional-AM (1981)
Paulo Rink – Athletico Paranaense (1990, 1992, 1993–1994, 1995–1997), Atlético Mineiro (1991), Santos (1999)

Hungary 
Leandro de Almeida – Athletico Paranaense (2005)

Italy 
André Anderson – São Paulo (2022–)
Cristian Ledesma – Santos (2015)
Daniel Bessa – Goiás (2020)
Éder – São Paulo (2021–)
Emerson Palmieri – Santos (2011–2015)
Gianpaolo Spagnulo – Vitoria (1997)
Rodrigo Possebon – Santos (2010–2011)
Rômulo – Santo André (2009), Cruzeiro (2010), Athletico Paranaense (2011)

Netherlands 
Clarence Seedorf – Botafogo (2012–2014)

Poland 
Krzysztof Nowak – Athletico Paranaense (1996–1998)
Mariusz Piekarski – Athletico Paranaense (1996–1997), Flamengo (1997)
Roger Guerreiro – São Caetano (2001–2002), Corinthians (2003), Flamengo (2004), Juventude (2005)

Portugal 
Bruno Pereirinha – Athletico Paranaense (2015–2017)
Deco – Corinthians (1996), Fluminense (2010–2013)
Fernando Peres – Vasco da Gama (1974), Sport Recife (1975), Treze (1976)
João Moreira – São Paulo (2022–)
Marcos Paulo – Fluminense (2019–2021)
Rafael Ramos – Corinthians (2022–)

Russia 
Ari – Fortaleza (2005)
Guilherme Marinato – Athletico Paranaense (2005–2007)

Serbia 
Dejan Petković – Vitória (1997–1999), Flamengo (2000–2002, 2009–2011), Vasco da Gama (2002–2003, 2004), Fluminense (2005–2006), Goiás (2006), Santos (2007), Atlético Mineiro (2008)
Vladimir Petković – Botafogo (2001)

Spain 
Catanha – Paysandu (1995), Atlético Mineiro (2005)
Diego Costa – Atlético Mineiro (2021)
Fran Mérida – Athletico Paranaense (2013–2014)
Juanfran – São Paulo (2019–2021)
Marcos Senna – Corinthians (1999–2000), Juventude (2001), São Caetano (2002)
Pablo Marí – Flamengo (2019)

Turkey 
Colin Kazim-Richards – Coritiba (2016), Corinthians (2017–2018)

Ukraine 
Júnior Moraes – Santos (2007–2008), Santo André (2009), Corinthians (2022–)
Marlos – Coritiba (2008–2009), São Paulo (2009–2011), Athletico Paranaense (2022–)

North and Central America, Caribbean (CONCACAF)

Costa Rica 
Bryan Ruiz – Santos (2018–2020)
Rodney Wallace – Sport Recife (2016)

Mexico 
Antonio de Nigris – Santos (2006)
Leandro Augusto – Criciúma (1996–1998), Internacional (1998), Botafogo (1999–2000)
Tuca Ferretti – Botafogo (1971–1975), Vasco da Gama (1975–1976)

Panama 
Felipe Baloy – Grêmio (2003–2004), Athletico Paranaense (2005)

United States 
Freddy Adu – Bahia (2013)
Jacob Montes – Botafogo (2022–)
Johnny Cardoso – Internacional (2019–)

South America (CONMEBOL)

Argentina 
Adrián Martínez – Coritiba (2022–)
Agustín Allione – Palmeiras (2014–2016), Bahia (2017–2018)
Alejandro Donatti – Flamengo (2016–2017)
Alejandro Mancuso – Palmeiras (1995), Flamengo (1996–1997)
Alejandro Martinuccio – Fluminense (2011, 2015), Cruzeiro (2012–2013), Chapecoense (2016–2017)
Ariel Nahuelpán – Coritiba (2008–2010), Internacional (2016–2017)
Agustín Cejas – Santos (1971–1975)
Alejandro Mena – Athletico Paranaense (2004)
Alexis Ferrero – Botafogo (2008)
Andrés D'Alessandro – Internacional (2008–2015, 2017–2020)
Ariel Cabral – Cruzeiro (2015–2019), Goiás (2020)
Braian Romero – Athletico Paranaense (2019), Internacional (2022–)
Carlos Buttice – America-RJ (1971–1972), Bahia (1972–1974), Corinthians (1974–1975)
Carlos Frontini – Vitória (2002), Ponte Preta (2005), Santos (2005), América de Natal (2007), Figueirense (2007), Goiás (2008)
Carlos Galván – Atlético Mineiro (1998–2000), Santos (2000–2002), Paysandu (2004)
Carlos Tevez – Corinthians (2005–2006)
Claudio Borghi – Flamengo (1989)
Cristian Pavón – Atlético Mineiro (2022–)
Damián Escudero – Grêmio (2011), Atlético Mineiro (2012), Vitória (2013–2014), Vasco da Gama (2017–2018)
Damián Musto – Internacional (2020)
Darío Bottinelli – Flamengo (2011–2012), Coritiba (2013)
Darío Conca – Vasco da Gama (2007), Fluminense (2008–2011, 2014), Flamengo (2017)
Diego Capria – Atlético Mineiro (2000)
Diego Churín – Grêmio (2020–2021), Atlético Goianiense (2022–)
Diego Torres – Chapecoense (2018–2019)
Eduardo Dreyer – Coritiba (1972–1975), Londrina (1976, 1977), Athletico Paranaense (1978)
Emanuel Biancucchi – Bahia (2014), Vasco da Gama (2015)
Emanuel Brítez – Fortaleza (2022–)
Emmanuel Martínez – América Mineiro (2022–)
Emiliano Rigoni – São Paulo (2021–)
Emiliano Vecchio – Santos (2016–2018)
Eugenio Isnaldo – Bahia (2021)
Ezequiel Cerutti – Coritiba (2020)
Ezequiel Miralles – Grêmio (2011–2012), Santos (2012)
Fabián Noguera – Santos (2016–2017)
Fábio de los Santos – Criciúma (1995), Bragantino (1997), Botafogo-SP (1999), Grêmio (2001–2002)
Fabricio Bustos – Internacional (2022–)
Fausto Vera – Corinthians (2022–)
Federico Mancuello – Flamengo (2016–2017), Cruzeiro (2018)
Federico Nieto – Athletico Paranaense (2010–2012)
Fernando Barrientos – Athletico Paranaense (2015–2016)
Fernando Ávalos – Corinthians (2000–2001)
Franco Di Santo – Atlético Mineiro (2019–2020)
Gabriel Carabajal – Santos (2022–)
Gabriel Mercado – Internacional (2021–)
Germán Cano – Vasco da Gama (2020), Fluminense (2022–)
Germán Conti – Bahia (2021), América Mineiro (2022–)
Germán Herrera – Grêmio (2006–2007, 2009–2010), Corinthians (2008), Botafogo (2010–2012)
Gervasio Núñez – Botafogo (2016–2017)
Giuliano Galoppo – São Paulo (2022–)
Héctor Canteros – Flamengo (2014–2016), Chapecoense (2017–2018)
Héctor Veira – Corinthians (1976)
Hugo Colace – Flamengo (2008)
Ignacio Fernández – Atlético Mineiro (2021–)
Javier Mascherano – Corinthians (2005–2006)
Javier Toledo – Athletico Paranaense (2010)
Jesús Dátolo – Internacional (2012–2013), Atlético Mineiro (2013–2016)
Joel Carli – Botafogo (2016–2019, 2022–)
Jonathan Calleri – São Paulo (2016, 2021–)
Jonathan Gómez – São Paulo (2017–2018), CSA (2019), Sport Recife (2020)
Jorge Paolino – Flamengo (1976–1977)
José Manuel López – Palmeiras (2022–)
Juan Ferreyra – Botafogo (2014)
Juan Manuel Martínez – Corinthians (2012)
Keko Villalva – Goiás (2020)
Kevin Lomónaco – Red Bull Bragantino (2022–)
Leandro Fernández – Internacional (2020)
Leandro Zárate – Botafogo (2008)
Leonardo Gil – Vasco da Gama (2020)
Livio Prieto – Atlético Mineiro (2005)
Lucas Mugni – Flamengo (2014–2015), Sport Recife (2020), Bahia (2021)
Lucas Pratto – Atlético Mineiro (2015–2016), São Paulo (2017)
Lucho González – Athletico Paranaense (2016–2021)
Manuel Lanzini – Fluminense (2011–2012)
Marco Ruben – Athletico Paranaense (2019)
Mariano Trípodi – Santos (2008), Vitória (2008), Atlético Mineiro (2009), Joinville (2015)
Mariano Vázquez – Fortaleza (2019–2021)
Mario Bolatti – Internacional (2011–2012), Botafogo (2014)
Martín Benítez – Vasco da Gama (2020), São Paulo (2021), América Mineiro (2022–)
Martín Sarrafiore – Internacional (2018–2019), Coritiba (2020)
Mauro Boselli – Corinthians (2019–2020)
Matías Defederico – Corinthians (2009–2010)
Matías Zaracho – Atlético Mineiro (2020–)
Maxi Biancucchi – Flamengo (2007–2009), Vitória (2013), Bahia (2014)
Maxi Rolón – Santos (2016)
Miguel Ángel Ortíz – Atlético Mineiro (1976–1977), Comercial-SP (1978), Caxias (1979)
Nahuel Bustos – São Paulo (2022–)
Narciso Doval – Flamengo (1969–1970, 1972–1975), Fluminense (1976–1978)
Nicolás Otamendi – Atlético Mineiro (2014)
Patito Rodríguez – Santos (2012–2013, 2014)
Paulo Rosales – Bahia (2013)
Raúl Estévez – Botafogo (2004)
Raúl Iberbia – Coritiba (2013–2014)
Renzo Saravia – Internacional (2020–2021), Botafogo (2022–)
Rodolfo Fischer – Botafogo (1972–1976), Vitória (1976)
Rodrigo Díaz – Athletico Paranaense (2009)
Rubens Sambueza – Flamengo (2008)
Sebastián Domínguez – Corinthians (2005–2006)
Sergio Escudero – Corinthians (2009–2010), Coritiba (2012–2013), Criciúma (2014)
Silvio Romero – Fortaleza (2022–)
Tomás Andrade – Atlético Mineiro (2018), Athletico Paranaense (2019)
Tomás Cuello – Red Bull Bragantino (2020–2021), Athletico Paranaense (2022–)
Ubaldo Fillol – Flamengo (1984–1985)
Valentín Depietri – Fortaleza (2021–)
Víctor Cuesta – Internacional (2017–2021), Botafogo (2022–)
Walter Kannemann – Grêmio (2016–2021)
Walter Montillo – Cruzeiro (2010–2012), Santos (2013), Botafogo (2017)

Bolivia 
Carlos Aragonés – Palmeiras (1981–1984), Coritiba (1984–1985)
Damián Lizio – Botafogo (2016–2017)
Edivaldo Rojas – Athletico Paranaense (2004, 2008), Figueirense (2005)
Henry Vaca – Atlético Goianiense (2020)
José Alfredo Castillo – Atlético Mineiro (2008)
Juan Carlos Arce – Corinthians (2007), Sport Recife (2009)
Luis Alberto Gutiérrez – Bahia (2012)
Luis Alí – Ponte Preta (2017–2018)
Marcelo Moreno – Cruzeiro (2007–2008, 2014), Grêmio (2012), Flamengo (2013)
Miguel Terceros – Santos (2022–)
Pablo Escobar – Ipatinga (2008), Santo André (2009)
Rodrigo Ramallo – Vitória (2016-2017) 
Sebastián Molina – Athletico Paranaense (2009)

Chile 
Alejandro Escalona – Grêmio (2006)
Ángelo Araos – Corinthians (2018, 2020–2021)
Ángelo Henríquez – Fortaleza (2021–2022)
Arturo Vidal – Flamengo (2022–)
Benjamín Kuscevic – Palmeiras (2020–)
Carlos Palacios – Internacional (2021)
César Pinares – Grêmio (2020–2021)
Charles Aránguiz – Internacional (2014–2015)
Christian Vilches – Athletico Paranaense (2015–2016)
Claudio Maldonado – São Paulo (2000–2003), Cruzeiro (2003–2005), Santos (2006–2007), Flamengo (2009–2012), Corinthians (2013)
Cristián Suárez – Corinthians (2008)
Eduardo Vargas – Grêmio (2013), Atlético Mineiro (2020–)
Elías Figueroa – Internacional (1972–1976)
Erick Pulgar – Flamengo (2022–)
Esteban Pavez – Athletico Paranaense (2017–2018)
Eugenio Mena – Santos (2013–2014), Cruzeiro (2015), São Paulo (2016), Sport Recife (2017), Bahia (2018)
Felipe Seymour – Cruzeiro (2015), Vasco da Gama (2015)
Francisco Arancibia – Palmeiras (2015–2016)
Gonzalo Fierro – Flamengo (2008–2011)
Gustavo Canales – Botafogo (2016–2017)
Ignacio Jara – Goiás (2020)
Jean Paul Pineda – Vitória (2017)
Johnny Herrera – Corinthians (2006)
Jorge Valdivia – Palmeiras (2006–2008, 2010–2012, 2014–2015)
José Luis Villanueva – Vasco da Gama (2008)
Leonardo Gil – Vasco da Gama (2020–2021)
Leonardo Valencia – Botafogo (2017–2019)
Luciano Cabral – Athletico Paranaense (2016)
Luis Pedro Figueroa – Palmeiras (2009–2010)
Marcos González – Flamengo (2012–2014)
Mark González – Sport Recife (2016)
Mauricio Isla – Flamengo (2020–2022)
Mauricio Pinilla – Vasco da Gama (2008)
Nelson Tapia – Santos (2004)
Nicolás Castillo – Juventude (2021)
Paulo Magalhães – Internacional (2016)
Roberto Cereceda – Figueirense (2014–2015)
Sebastián Pinto – Santos (2008)

Colombia 
Álex Escobar – Atlético Mineiro (1996)
Anderson Plata – Athletico Paranaense (2018–2019)
Andrés Colorado – São Paulo (2022–)
Brayan Ceballos – Fortaleza (2022–)
Brayan Lucumí – Coritiba (2020)
César Haydar – Red Bull Bragantino (2020–2021)
Cristian Borja – Internacional (2007), Flamengo (2010)
Daniel Hernández – Athletico Paranaense (2015)
Darío Muñoz – Palmeiras (2001–2006), Goiás (2006)
David Ferreira – Athletico Paranaense (2005–2010)
Dayro Moreno – Athletico Paranaense (2006)
Dylan Borrero – Atlético Mineiro (2020–2021)
Mono Montoya – Athletico Paranaense (2006)
Eduard Atuesta – Palmeiras (2022–)
Edwin Valencia – Athletico Paranaense (2017–2010), Fluminense (2010–2014), Santos (2015–2016)
Felipe Aguilar – Santos (2019–2020), Athletico Paranaense (2020)
Fernando Uribe – Flamengo (2018–2019), Santos (2019–2020)
Freddy Rincón – Palmeiras (1993–1995), Corinthians (1997–2000, 2004), Santos (2000), Cruzeiro (2001)
Gustavo Cuéllar – Flamengo (2016–2019)
Gustavo del Toro – Atlético Mineiro (2000)
Gustavo Torres – Vasco da Gama (2020)
Hugo Rodallega – Bahia (2021)
Iván Angulo – Botafogo (2020)
Jaime Alvarado – Athletico Paranaense (2020)
Jaminton Campaz – Grêmio (2021)
Javier Reina – Ceará (2010, 2018)
Jhon Arias – Fluminense (2021–)
Jhon Vásquez – Ceará (2022–)
Jonathan Copete – Santos (2016–2019), Avaí (2022)
Jonny Mosquera – Avaí (2019)
Jorge Serna – Athletico Paranaense (2010)
Jown Cardona – Ceará (2018–2019)
Juan Angulo – Bahia (2013)
Juan Carlos Díaz – Coritiba (2022–)
Juan Carlos Henao – Santos (2005)
Juan Manuel Cuesta – Internacional (2021)
Juan Pablo Ramírez – Bahia (2021), América Mineiro (2022–)
Juan Quintero – Fortaleza (2019–2020), Juventude (2021)
Julián Viáfara – Athletico Paranaense (2006–2008), Vitória (2008–2011)
Kelvin Osorio – Cuiabá (2022–)
Luis Carlos Ruiz – Sport Recife (2016)
Luis Orejuela – Cruzeiro (2019), Grêmio (2020), São Paulo (2021), Athletico Paranaense (2022–)
Marlos Moreno – Flamengo (2018)
Mauricio Molina – Santos (2008–2009)
Miguel Borja – Palmeiras (2017–2019), Grêmio (2021)
Nicolás Hernández – Athletico Paranaense (2021–)
Orlando Berrío – Flamengo (2017–2020), América Mineiro (2021)
Oswaldo Henríquez – Sport Recife (2016–2018), Vasco da Gama (2018–2019)
Pablo Armero – Palmeiras (2009–2010), Bahia (2017), CSA (2019)
Reinaldo Lenis – Sport Recife (2016–2018)
Richard Ríos – Flamengo (2020–2021)
Santiago Tréllez – Vitória (2017), São Paulo (2018, 2020), Internacional (2019)
Samuel Vanegas – Athletico Paranaense (2010)
Sergio Herrera – Athletico Paranaense (2010)
Sherman Cárdenas – Atlético Mineiro (2015), Vitória (2016–2017)
Stiven Mendoza – Corinthians (2015), Bahia (2017), Ceará (2021–)
Víctor Aristizábal – São Paulo (1996–1998), Santos (1998–1999), Vitória (2002), Cruzeiro (2003), Coritiba (2004)
Víctor Cantillo – Corinthians (2020–)
Vladimir Marín – Athletico Paranaense (2005)
Vladimir Hernández – Santos (2017)
Wason Rentería – Internacional (2005–2006), Atlético Mineiro (2009), Santos (2011–2012)
Yesus Cabrera – Cuiabá (2021)
Yílmar Filigrana – Coritiba (2017)
Yimmi Chará – Atlético Mineiro (2018–2019)
Yony González – Fluminense (2019), Corinthians (2020), Ceará (2021)

Ecuador 
Alan Franco – Atlético Mineiro (2020–2021)
Anthony Landázuri – Fortaleza (2022–)
Álex Bolaños – Santa Cruz (2016)
Bryan Angulo – Santos (2022–)
Bryan Cabezas – Fluminense (2018-2019)
Bryan García – Athletico Paranaense (2022–)
Carlos Tenorio – Vasco da Gama (2012-2013)
Édison Méndez – Atlético Mineiro (2010)
Frickson Erazo – Flamengo (2014), Grêmio (2015), Atlético Mineiro (2016–2017), Vasco da Gama (2018)
Fernando Guerrero – Chapecoense (2017)
Patricio Urrutia – Fluminense (2009)
Gabriel Cortez – Botafogo (2020)
Gilson de Souza – Vasco da Gama (1989), Athletico Paranaense (1993)
Hólger Quiñónez – Vasco da Gama (1989–1991)
Jayro Campos – Atlético Mineiro (2010)
Jefferson Orejuela – Fluminense (2017)
Jhojan Julio – Santos (2022–)
José Hurtado – Red Bull Bragantino (2022–)
Néicer Reasco – São Paulo (2006-2008)
Jorge Martínez – Coritiba (1986)
Joffre Guerrón – Cruzeiro (2009–2010), Athletico Paranaense (2010–2012)
Joao Rojas – São Paulo (2018–2021)
Juan Cazares – Atlético Mineiro (2016–2019), Corinthians (2020), Fluminense (2021)
Junior Sornoza – Fluminense (2017–2018), Corinthians (2019)
Léo Realpe – Red Bull Bragantino (2020–)
Luis Bolaños – Santos (2009), Internacional (2009)
Luis Caicedo – Cruzeiro (2017, 2018)
Mario Pineida – Fluminense (2022–)
Michael Quiñónez – Santos (2008)
Michael Arroyo – Grêmio (2017-2018)
Miller Bolaños – Grêmio (2016-2017)
Robert Arboleda – São Paulo (2017–)
Cristian Penilla – Chapecoense (2017)
Wagner Rivera – Flamengo (1996)
Giovanny Espinoza – Cruzeiro (2008)

Paraguay 
Adalberto Román – Palmeiras (2012)
Ángel Romero – Corinthians (2014–2018)
Antonio Galeano – Sao Paulo (2021)
Brian Montenegro – Athletico Goianiense (2021)
Carlos Gamarra – Internacional (1995–1997), Corinthians (1998–1999), Flamengo (2000–2001), Palmeiras (2005–2006)
César Benítez – Coritiba (2016, 2018)
César Pinares – Grêmio (2020–2021)
César Ramírez – Flamengo (2005–2006)
Cristian Riveros – Grêmio (2013–2014)
Derlis Florentín – Palmeiras (2007)
Derlis González – Santos (2018–2020)
Diego Gavilán – Internacional (2003, 2004–2005), Grêmio (2007), Flamengo (2008), Portuguesa (2008)
Edgar Aguilera – Athletico Paranaense (1998)
Edgar Balbuena – Corinthians (2009–2010)
Edgardo Orzusa – Chapecoense (2018–2019)
Enrique Meza – Sport Recife (2014), Chapecoense (2014)
Estanislao Struway – Portuguesa (1997), Coritiba (1998–1999)
Fabián Balbuena – Corinthians (2016–2018, 2022–)
Feliciano Brizuela – Avaí (2019)
Guillermo Beltrán – Vitória (2014)
Francisco Reyes – Flamengo (1971–1973)
Gustavo Gómez – Palmeiras (2018–)
Héctor Bustamante – CSA (2019)
Hernán Pérez – Coritiba (2022–)
Isidro Pitta – Juventude (2022–)
Iván González – Athletico Paranaense (2010–2011)
Iván Piris – Sao Paulo (2011–2012)
Jorge González – Paraná (2018)
Jorge Mendoza – Ponte Preta (2017)
Jorge Ortega – Coritiba (2016)
Jose Ortigoza – Palmeiras, Cruzeiro, Paraná (2009, 2011–2012, 2018)
Juan Carlos Villamayor – Corinthians (1996), Ponte Preta (1999)
Julio dos Santos – Grêmio (2008), Athletico Paranaense (2008–2009), Vasco da Gama (2015–2017)
Julio Cáceres – Atlético Mineiro (2005, 2010)
Julio Irrazábal – Vasco da Gama (2010-2011)
Julio Manzur – Santos (2006)
Junior Alonso – Atlético Mineiro (2021, 2022–)
Léo Valencia – Botafogo (2017–2019)
Lucas Barrios – Palmeiras, Grêmio (2016–2017)
Luis Cáceres – Vitória (2013–2014), Coritiba (2015–2016)
Matías Galarza – Coritiba (2022–)
Marcelo Báez – Paraná (2018)
Mario Saldívar – Figueirense (2012)
Mathías Villasanti – Grêmio (2021)
Miguel Samudio – Cruzeiro (2014)
Miguel Sanabria – Coritiba (1988)
Nelson Cuevas – Santos (2008)
Nery Bareiro – Coritiba (2016), Chapecoense (2018)
Néstor Camacho – Avaí (2015)
Óscar Ruiz – Bahia (2021), Juventude (2022–)
Pablo Giménez – Atlético Mineiro (2005)
Pablo Zeballos – Botafogo (2014)
Pedro Benítez – Atlético Mineiro (2009–2010)
Pedro Molinas – Sport Recife (1974)
Ramón Martínez – Atlético Mineiro (2019), Coritiba (2020)
Raúl Bobadilla – Fluminense (2021)
Raúl Cáceres – Vasco da Gama (2019), América Mineiro (2022–)
Richard Franco – Avaí (2019)
Robert Piris Da Motta – Flamengo (2018–2019, 2021)
Roberto Fernández – Vitória (2014–2015), Figueirense (2016), Botafogo (2017–2020, 2022–)
Rodolfo Gamarra – CSA (2019)
Romerito – Fluminense (1984–1988)
Sergio Díaz – Corinthians (2018–2019)
Víctor Cáceres – Flamengo (2012–2015)
William Mendieta – Palmeiras (2014)
Wilson Pittoni – Figueirense (2011–2012), Bahia (2014, 2015)

Peru 
Abel Lobatón – Athletico Paranaense (2000, 2003)
Alberto Gallardo – Palmeiras (1966–1968)
Alexander Lecaros – Botafogo (2020)
Beto da Silva – Grêmio (2017-2018)
Christian Cueva – São Paulo (2016–2018), Santos (2019)
Fernando Pacheco – Fluminense (2020), Juventude (2021)
Kevin Quevedo – Goiás (2020)
Luis Advíncula – Ponte Preta (2013)
Luis Ramírez – Corinthians (2011–2013), Ponte Preta (2013), Botafogo (2014)
Miguel Trauco – Flamengo (2017–2019)
Marko Ciurlizza – Botafogo (2001)
Martín Hidalgo – Internacional (2006–2008)
Nilson Loyola – Goiás (2019)
Paolo Guerrero – Corinthians (2012–2015), Flamengo (2015–2018), Internacional (2019–2021), Avaí (2022–)
Ramón Mifflin – Santos (1974–1975)
Roberto Palacios – Cruzeiro (1997)
Raúl Ruidíaz – Coritiba (2012–2013)
Yoshimar Yotún – Vasco da Gama (2013)

Uruguay 
Abel Hernández – Internacional (2020), Fluminense (2021)
Agustín Canobbio – Athletico Paranaense (2022–)
Agustín Viana – Atlético Mineiro (2008)
Antonio Esmerode – Coritiba (2004–2005)
Álvaro Navarro – Botafogo (2015)
Alvaro Pereira – São Paulo (2014)
Alberto Acosta – Náutico (2007), Corinthians (2009)
Braian Rodríguez – Grêmio (2015–2016)
Bruno Méndez – Corinthians (2019–2020, 2022–), Internacional (2021–2022)
Bruno Silva – Internacional (2010)
Carlos Cabrera – Sport Recife (1977–1978)
Carlos de Pena – Internacional (2022–)
Carlos Gutiérrez – Atlético Mineiro (2002–2003)
Carlos Nicola – Athletico Paranaense (2000–2001)
Carlos Sánchez – Santos (2018–)
Cláudio Milar – Juventude (1997), Botafogo (2001)
Daniel González – Portuguesa (1978, 1980–1981), Corinthians (1982–1983), Vasco da Gama (1983–1985)
Darío Pereyra – São Paulo (1977–1988), Flamengo (1988), Palmeiras (1989)
David Terans – Atlético Mineiro (2018–2019), Athletico Paranaense (2021–)
Diego Forlán – Internacional (2012-2013)  
Diego Godín – Atlético Mineiro (2022)  
Diego Lugano – São Paulo (2003-2006, 2016-2017)
Egidio Arévalo Ríos – Botafogo (2011)
Emiliano Martínez – Red Bull Bragantino (2021–)
Emiliano Velázquez – Santos (2021–2022)
Fabián Carini – Atlético Mineiro (2009–2010)
Federico Barrandeguy – Botafogo (2020)
Federico Gino – Cruzeiro (2016)
Fernando Kanapkis – Atlético Mineiro (1993–1994)
Fernando Álvez – Botafogo (1987)
Fernando Rosa – Atlético Mineiro (1993–1994)
Gabriel Clemata – Athletico Paranaense (1982)
Gabriel Neves – São Paulo (2021–)
Giorgian De Arrascaeta – Cruzeiro (2015–2018), Flamengo (2019–)
Gonzalo Mastriani – América Mineiro (2022–)
Gonzalo Carneiro – São Paulo (2018–2020)
Gonzalo Sorondo – Internacional (2007–2011)
Guillermo de los Santos – Coritiba (2022–)
Gustavo Matosas – São Paulo (1993), Athletico Paranaense (1996), Goiás (1997)
Héctor Cincunegui – Atlético Mineiro (1971–1973)
Horacio Peralta – Flamengo (2006)
Hugo de León – Grêmio (1981–1984), Corinthians (1984–1985), Santos (1986–1987), Botafogo (1991)
Jesús Trindade – Coritiba (2022–)
Joaquín Piquerez – Palmeiras (2021–)
Jonatan Álvez – Internacional (2018–2019)
Jorge Caraballo – Goiás (1986–1987)
Juan Castillo – Botafogo (2008–2009)
Juan de Lima – Botafogo (1987)
Juan Pintado – Goiás (2020)
Juan Manuel Olivera – Náutico (2013)
Juan Salgueiro – Botafogo (2016)
Ladislao Mazurkiewicz – Atlético Mineiro (1972–1974)
Leandro Barcia – Goiás (2019), Sport Recife (2020–2021), Atlético Goianiense (2022)
Loco Abreu – Grêmio (1998), Botafogo (2010–2012), Figueirense (2012)
Lucas Hernández – Atlético Mineiro (2019), Cuiabá (2021)
Lucas Olaza – Athletico Paranaense (2014–2015)
Luis Aguiar – Vitória (2014)
Marcelo Lipatín – Coritiba (2000), Grêmio (2006)
Marcelo Palau – Athletico Paranaense (2013)
Marco Vanzini – Juventude (2007)
Mario Risso – Botafogo (2014)
Martín Ligüera – Athletico Paranaense (2012–2013)
Martín Rea – Atlético Mineiro (2018–2019)
Martín Silva – Vasco da Gama (2015, 2017–2018)
Martín Taborda – Corinthians (1978–1979, 1981–1982), Coritiba (1980), Sport Recife (1980), Portuguesa (1982, 1984)
Matías Mirabaje – Athletico Paranaense (2014)
Matías Viña – Palmeiras (2020–2021)
Mauricio Victorino – Cruzeiro (2011–2014), Palmeiras (2014)
Maxi Rodríguez – Grêmio (2013–2015)
Michel Araújo – Fluminense (2020, 2022–)
Miguel Merentiel – Palmeiras (2022–)
Nicolás Freitas – Internacional (2015)
Nicolás Lodeiro – Botafogo (2012–2014), Corinthians (2014–2015)
Nicolás López – Internacional (2016–2019)
Niki – Botafogo (1995–1996)
Pablo García – Coritiba (2022–)
Pablo Siles – Athletico Paranaense (2022)
Paulo Pezzolano – Athletico Paranaense (2006)
Pedro Rocha – São Paulo (1970–1978), Coritiba (1978), Palmeiras (1979)
Pedro Varela – Botafogo (1988)
Richard Morales – Grêmio (2008)
Robert Flores – Sport Recife (2014)
Rodolfo Rodríguez – Santos (1984–1988), Portuguesa (1990–1992), Bahia (1992–1994)
Rodrigo Aguirre – Botafogo (2018)
Rodrigo Fernández – Santos (2022–)
Santiago García – Athletico Paranaense (2011–2012)
Santiago Romero – Fortaleza (2019)
Santiago Silva – Corinthians (2002)
Sebastián Eguren – Palmeiras (2014)
Sérgio Ramírez – Flamengo (1977–1979), Sport Recife (1980), Ferroviário-CE (1981), Campo Grande (1983), Pinheiros (1985)
Sergio Orteman – Grêmio (2008–2009)
Walter Olivera – Athletico Paranaense (1984)

Venezuela 
Alejandro Guerra – Palmeiras (2017–2019), Bahia (2019)
Alexander Rondón – São Paulo (2004)
Ángelo Peña – Náutico (2013-2014)
Breitner – Santos (2010, 2011), Náutico (2012)
César González – Coritiba (2016–2017)
Cristhian Rivas – Cuiabá (2022–)
Jan Hurtado – Red Bull Bragantino (2021–)
Jefferson Savarino – Atlético Mineiro (2020–2021)
Jhon Chancellor – Coritiba (2022–)
Luis Manuel Seijas – Chapecoense (2016–2018)
Matías Lacava – Santos (2021)
Nahuel Ferraresi – São Paulo (2022–)
Rómulo Otero – Atlético Mineiro (2016–2018, 2019–2021), Corinthians (2021), Fortaleza (2022–)
Vito Fassano – Cruzeiro (1967–1969)
Yeferson Soteldo – Santos (2019–2021, 2022–)

References

Notes

External links
Brazilian Série A at National-Football-Teams.com

Campeonato Brasileiro Série A players
Brazil
Expatriate footballers in Brazil
Association football player non-biographical articles